Dreamcatcher (formerly known as MINX; also stylized as Dream Catcher) is a South Korean girl group formed by Happyface Entertainment (now Dreamcatcher Company). The group consists of seven members: JiU, SuA, Siyeon, Handong, Yoohyeon, Dami and Gahyeon. They made their official debut on January 13, 2017, with the single album Nightmare.

Dreamcatcher originally debuted under the name MINX, releasing the single "Why Did You Come to My Home" on September 18, 2014, with a five-member lineup of JiU, SuA, Siyeon, Yoohyeon, and Dami. Their last release as MINX was the EP Love Shake in July 2015. In November 2016, the group announced that they would re-debut in 2017 under the new name Dreamcatcher, with two new members Handong and Gahyeon, as well as a new darker concept with a non-mainstream music style to stand out from other K-pop girl groups.

Dreamcatcher has come to be known as "The Face of Rock in K-pop" and their music has been praised for its distinctive sound with elements of rock and metal.

Career

2014–2016: MINX

Under the name Minx, the group held their first live performance at the Oak Valley Summertime Festival on August 9, 2014, where they performed two original songs: "Action" and "Why Did You Come To My Home". On September 15, Happyface Entertainment officially announced their new girl group, and Minx released their debut digital single "Why Did You Come to My Home" on September 18. The song was described as a "new take on the children's rhyme" of the same name. 
Minx made their official debut on M Countdown on September 18 and ended promotions on October 26 with a final performance on Inkigayo. That December, they released a holiday single, a cover of "Rockin' Around the Christmas Tree" with girl group and labelmate Dal Shabet.

In July 2015, Minx released their first EP, Love Shake, with a lead single of the same name. The single was promoted as a "joyous song" that "goes well with summer", a remake of the song "Love Shake" from Dal Shabet's Bang Bang album. On the same day, Minx held a press showcase at Ellui, a club in Seoul. They performed their first comeback stage on The Show on June 30 and Show Champion on July 1.

2017: Re-debut as Dreamcatcher and Prequel
In November 2016, after a year of limited activity, Happyface Entertainment revealed that Minx would re-debut under the name Dreamcatcher with two additional members, Handong and Gahyeon. In a later interview, CEO Lee Joowon said that he believed Minx had failed because there were too many K-pop girl groups promoting at that time with a similar "cute" concept and music style. He explained that Dreamcatcher was intended to have a "girl group style that didn’t exist in Korea, a girl group concept that didn’t happen very often" and that the point of launching Dreamcatcher would be to do "what others won't do." The group re-debuted with the release of their single album Nightmare and its lead single "Chase Me" on January 13, 2017. On January 19, they held an official debut stage at M Countdown with "Chase Me".

On April 5, Dreamcatcher released their second single album Fall Asleep in the Mirror
with lead single "Good Night". The song was later covered by all-female rock band Rolling Quartz in 2022.

Dreamcatcher released their first EP under their new name, Prequel, on July 27. The album contained six tracks, including lead single "Fly High". The album debuted at number five on the Billboard World Albums Chart. On August 1, Happyface Entertainment announced that Dreamcatcher would hold their first world tour after wrapping up promotions for Prequel.

On October 3, Happyface Entertainment announced that Dreamcatcher would join the show Mix Nine. Although JiU was still ranked among the top 9 female contestants, by December 10, Happyface Entertainment announced that all members participating in the show would leave due to a schedule conflict with their tour in Brazil. On December 8, Happyface Entertainment announced that in collaboration with MyMusicTaste, Dreamcatcher would tour seven countries in Europe in February 2018 as part of their "Fly High" World Tour. Happyface Entertainment announced on December 28 that Dreamcatcher would hold a fan meeting on January 13, 2018, to celebrate the first anniversary of their debut with fans.  All tickets to the fan meeting sold out in under one minute after sales opened to public on January 2.

Towards the end of the year, Dreamcatcher received critical acclaim from music critics worldwide for their unique sound that incorporated influences of rock and metal music. "Chase Me" placed at number 19 on Billboards Best K-Pop Songs of 2017: Critics' Picks, and Dreamcatcher was listed number three on Billboard's Best New K-Pop Acts in 2017.

2018: Rising success and first world tour 
On January 4, 2018, Happyface Entertainment revealed that Dreamcatcher would release a new digital single dedicated to fans in celebration of their first anniversary, composed by Ollounder (오종훈) and Leez (이수민), who also composed Dreamcatcher's previous lead singles "Chase Me" and "Good Night". The digital single "Full Moon" was released alongside a promotional video on January 12. The single peaked number 16 on the Billboard World Digital Song Sales chart. On January 13, Dreamcatcher held their first anniversary fan meeting at the Mary Hall Grand Theatre at Sogang University, where they performed "Full Moon" for the first time. In February 2018, Dreamcatcher became the first K-pop girl group to complete a tour of major European cities. The "Fly High" World Tour ran from February 14 to February 25, visiting London, Lisbon, Madrid, Amsterdam, Berlin, Warsaw, and Paris. In March 2018, the group announced their official fandom name to be "InSomnia".

On April 28, Dreamcatcher were appointed public relations ambassador for copyright protection for Microsoft's latest Blockchain Security Technology commercialization and copyright protection campaign. 

On May 10, Dreamcatcher released their second EP, Escape the Era, with the lead single "You and I". Escape the Eras Outside and Inside versions ranked numbers one and three, respectively, on Hanteo's album chart and peaked at number three on Gaon and number one on China's Yinyuetai. It debuted on the Billboard World Albums chart at number seven. The group announced a Latin American tour on May 17, 2018, called "Welcome to the Dream World in Latin America", which kicked off on July 27 in Buenos Aires, Argentina and ended on August 5 in Panama City, Panama. On July 15, Dreamcatcher signed with Pony Canyon to make their Japanese debut in the fall.

On August 12, Dreamcatcher made their first appearance in the United States, performing at KCON 2018 in Los Angeles.

Their third EP, Alone in the City, was released on September 20, 2018. On October 5, it was announced that Dreamcatcher would debut in Japan in November with a Japanese version of their single "What", scheduled for release on November 21. On October 20, Yoohyeon made her debut as a runway model at Seoul Fashion Week 2019 S/S.

2019: Touring, first Japanese studio album and breakthrough 
On February 13, Dreamcatcher released their fourth EP, The End of Nightmare, containing new single "PIRI", which showcased Dreamcatcher's signature rock acoustics and incorporation of music from its namesake musical instrument. On the same day, Happyface Entertainment announced that they had changed their name to Dreamcatcher Company, in a sign of more support for Dreamcatcher. After promotions of "PIRI", Dreamcatcher went on their Asia Tour "Invitation from Nightmare City", which was announced to be held in numerous cities—Jakarta, Manila, Singapore, Seoul, and Japanese cities Tokyo and Kobe—from March to May 2019. However, due to undisclosed reasons, the concert stop in Jakarta was later canceled; instead, a short fan meeting was held. On July, 3 more shows were announced as part of the "Invitation From Nightmare City" tour, including Australian cities Melbourne and Sydney and Kuala Lumpur, Malaysia. Concerts were to take place from late August to early September. Unfortunately, due to a fire occurring at the theater on August 31, Dreamcatcher canceled their Melbourne stop. On August 31, Dreamcatcher announced the official first-generation membership for their fanclub "InSomnia". Both Korean and Japanese fanclub applications opened on September 2 for one month.

On September 11, the group released their first Japanese studio album titled The Beginning of The End, which includes Japanese versions of most of their lead singles and two new Japanese singles. The music video for the track "Breaking Out" was released two days prior to the album release, and Dreamcatcher held a showcase to promote and perform the new Japanese songs broadcast on LINE Live. Together with the release of Dreamcatcher's Korean comeback EP Raid of Dream, the music video of their new Korean song "Deja Vu" was unveiled on September 18. A Japanese version of the song was also uploaded simultaneously. The song was a collaboration with the mobile game King's Raid.

After "Deja Vu" promotions, Dreamcatcher embarked on their second European tour from October 24 to November 7, visiting London, Milan, Berlin, Warsaw, Paris, Amsterdam, and Helsinki. Thereafter, the group also held their first ever tour in the United States from December 6 to December 15, visiting Los Angeles, Chicago, Dallas, Orlando, and Jersey City. Handong was absent from both Europe and America tours due to at the time unspecified reasons, later revealed to be her participation in Idol Producer.

2020: Handong's temporary absence, first Korean studio album and international recognition 
Dreamcatcher released their first full length Korean studio album, Dystopia: The Tree of Language, on February 18 along with the music video for the uptempo EDM-rock song "Scream". The album featured eight new songs, packaged with Dreamcatcher's previous two fan songs "Full Moon" and "Over the Sky", as well as Siyeon's solo debut song "Paradise". The album was the first part of the "Dystopia" series and the group's first album since 2017. Dreamcatcher's third Japanese single, "Endless Night", was released on March 11, after its official music video was released a week earlier via Pony Canyon's YouTube channel. 

On March 12, Dreamcatcher announced support for Handong's participation in the Chinese Idol-producing show Youth With You. 

From March 20, Dreamcatcher held a two-week-long follow-up promotion on "Black or White", a song from their first studio album, days after promotions for "Red Sun" and "Scream" ended in the second week of March.

On May 1, Millenasia Project announced that Dreamcatcher, alongside Korean boy group In2It and female soloist AleXa, would feature in their song "Be The Future". The project, supported by UNESCO's Global Education Coalition, emphasized the importance of maintaining good hygiene practices and expressed gratitude to teaching staff worldwide for their continued efforts in educating students during the COVID-19 pandemic. The music video of the song was released on May 6.

On June 16, Dreamcatcher released a teaser for their new song "R.o.S.E BLUE", an OST collaboration for the mobile game Girl Cafe Gun.
The song was released on July 15. Following "Deja Vu" in 2019, it was the second soundtrack that Dreamcatcher released for a game.

As part of an ongoing collaboration with MyMusicTaste, Dreamcatcher performed a six-member concert, called "Global Streaming Into The Night & Dystopia", on July 4, the group's first online concert for a global audience.

On July 8, Siyeon released the OST track "Good Sera" for the drama Memorials, her second after her Love & Secret OST collaboration "Two of Us" in 2014. On August 7, Yoohyeon made a special cameo appearance in the drama Backstreet Rookie.

On August 17, Dreamcatcher released their fifth EP Dystopia: Lose Myself, the second installment of the "Dystopia" series, which became their best selling album to date. The music video for the track "BOCA" from the EP was released on August 18.

On October 16, after her return from China was delayed by circumstances surrounding the COVID-19 pandemic, Handong officially rejoined the group and released her solo debut song, "First Light of Dawn", on October 19.

On November 9, Dreamcatcher officially joined the social media platform Weverse.

On November 20, Dreamcatcher released their fourth Japanese single "No More". On November 21, Siyeon released her third OST track "No Mind" for the drama Get Revenge. On November 27, Dreamcatcher announced that they would be performing the opening theme song for anime television series King's Raid: Successors of the Will, titled "Eclipse". The song was released on December 25, and a full version was released in March 2021.

2021–present: Dystopia: Road to Utopia, Summer Holiday and Apocalypse: Save Us 
With the third installment of the "Dystopia" series, the group announced their new comeback with their sixth EP, Dystopia: Road to Utopia and its lead single "Odd Eye", which was released on January 26, 2021.

On May 14, 2021, Dami and Siyeon released an OST "Shadow" for the drama Dark Hole in two versions; the original debuted at number one on K-OSTs chart and number five on the rock genre charts. On May 16, 2021,  the Korea Entertainment Producer’s Association (KEPA) released a song to provide comfort during the COVID-19 pandemic, "NOW N NEW 2021", featuring Siyeon and Yoohyeon, as well as other 60 other singers, such as NCT's Doyoung, Red Velvet's Seulgi, and Park Bom. On July 1, 2021, Dreamcatcher announced their management contract with Pony Canyon would end on August 31. On July 5, 2021, SuA was announced to be a regular guest on Wendy's Youngstreet shortly after Red Velvet's Wendy became the permanent nightly DJ host for SBS Power FM's radio show. On July 25, 2021, Dami was featured on the song "BUFFALO" by sunwoojunga.

On July 30, 2021, Dreamcatcher made their comeback with the song "BEcause" and the special EP Summer Holiday.

On April 12, 2022, Dreamcatcher released their second Korean studio album Apocalypse: Save Us and its lead single "Maison". On April 20, the group earned their first music show win with "Maison" on MBC M's Show Champion, 1,924 days after debut, setting a new record for girl groups for the longest time between debut and first win. On April 26, Dreamcatcher wrapped up their promotions with their goodbye stage performance on SBS MTV's The Show, where they earned their second music show win. On April 27, 2022, Dreamcatcher Company announced the Apocalypse: Save Us World Tour, scheduled to take place in America from June 28 to July 20, with stops in New York City, Reading, Louisville, Chicago, Minneapolis, Denver, San Francisco, and Los Angeles. After the initial announcement, an additional show was added in Los Angeles as well as Mexico City due to popular demand.

On May 15, 2022, Dreamcatcher performed in Frankfurt, Germany at KPOP.FLEX, the largest K-Pop festival ever held in Europe. On June 4, 2022, Dreamcatcher traveled to Barcelona, Spain to perform after becoming the first ever K-pop group to be invited to the Primavera Sound Festival. 

On August 16, 2022, SuA released her first OST track, "Still With You", for the drama Café Minamdang.

On October 4, 2022, Dreamcatcher Company announced a new leg of the 2022 world tour, with Dreamcatcher returning to tour Europe for the first time since November 2019. The Apocalypse: Follow Us tour was scheduled to start on November 14 and visit five countries: Germany, the Netherlands, Poland, the United Kingdom, and France. On October 11, Dreamcatcher released their seventh EP Apocalypse: Follow Us and its lead single "Vision".

In November 2022, all seven members of Dreamcatcher renewed their contracts early, before the end of their existing contracts.

On January 13, 2023, Dreamcatcher released a special single, "Reason" dedicated to fans in celebration of their sixth anniversary.

Members

 JiU – leader, vocalist
 SuA – dancer, vocalist
 Siyeon – vocalist
 Handong – vocalist
 Yoohyeon – vocalist
 Dami – rapper
 Gahyeon – vocalist

Discography

Korean albums
 Dystopia: The Tree of Language (2020)
 Apocalypse: Save Us (2022)

Japanese albums
 The Beginning of the End (2019)

Concerts

Headlining
Tours
Dreamcatcher 1st Tour Fly High (2017–2018)
Dreamcatcher Welcome to the Dream World (2018)
Dreamcatcher Concert: Invitation from Nightmare City (2019)
Dreamcatcher World Tour [Apocalypse: Save Us] (2022)
Dreamcatcher World Tour [Apocalypse: Follow Us] (2022)
Reason: Makes Dreamcatcher (2023)

Special concerts
Dreamcatcher 1st Concert – Fly High in Japan (2017)
Dreamcatcher 1st Concert in Seoul – Welcome to the Dream World (2018)
Dreamcatcher Concert: [Apocalypse: Broken Halloween] (2022)

Online concerts
Dreamcatcher Concert Global Streaming Into the Night & Dystopia (2020)
Dreamcatcher [Dystopia: Seven Spirits] (2020)
Dreamcatcher Concert Crossroads: Part 1. Utopia & Part 2. Dystopia (2021)
Dreamcatcher Online Concert: Halloween Midnight Circus (2021)

Videography

Awards and nominations

References

External links

  Official website (Japanese)

 
K-pop music groups
Musical groups established in 2014
2014 establishments in South Korea
South Korean girl groups
South Korean pop rock music groups
Musical groups from Seoul
Pony Canyon artists